Courtney Leon Freckleton  (born 17 January 1990), known professionally as Nines, is a British rapper. After releasing a string of mixtapes between 2012 and 2015, Nines signed to XL Recordings and released his debut album One Foot Out (2017), which charted at number 4 in the UK Albums Chart. In 2018, his second album Crop Circle charted at number 5, and he topped the chart with his third album Crabs in a Bucket in 2020.

Early life
Hailing from Harlesden. He grew up in Church End Estate in North-West London. His older siblings are Tyrone and Wayne Freckleton. In April 2008, Nines' brother, Wayne Freckleton (also known as Brandszino usually shortened to Brands or Zino), was gunned down and murdered in an alleged gangland attack.

Career

2007–2009: first appearance’s
Nines first appearance in music was seen locally in his borough on the Running Wid The Streets (also known as RWDS) DVD Volume 2 in 2007. He was featured freestyling at age 17 followed by some freestyles, which are now audio tracks on YouTube; such as "Piff,” “Fuck All the Hoes,” and "Nu Crack.”

2010–2014: Early mixtapes
On November 27, 2011, Nines released his first single, “AJ’D OUT [JD SHUTDOWN]” -- in the video Nines, purchased shoes from JD Sports for his young children from his neighborhood, which made the video gain notoriety and stand out. On December 25, 2011, Nines released his second single, "MY HOOD (Turkey Shutdown)” which once again stood out due to Nines handing out turkeys to families in his area. Nines' third single featuring fellow rappers Fathead and Shotgun, "Way It’s Gunna Go" was released on March 18, 2012. Nines' first appearance on a major platform was his Warm Up Session Freestyle was released on June 12, 2012, on SBTY. On October 14, 2012, Nines released his debut mixtape From Church Road to Hollywood. Nines released the music video for "CR (Grills Shutdown)" on November 28, 2012 on SBTY the song was originally on his mixtape and the videos was his most viewed at that point today sitting on 7.7 million views once again standing out due to nines purchasing grills for his friends. 

This was followed by Gone Till November (2013) the following year and titled after his absence from the music scene due to his imprisonment. Nines gradually saw a rise in popularity through his freestyle videos posted on online rap platform SB.TV.

Nines' online music videos for his third mixtape, Loyal to the Soil (2014), gained significant attention. "Money on My Mind" quickly amassed millions of views on YouTube. He is part of the collective Ice City Boyz alongside Likkle T, Skrapz, J Styles, Fatz, Big Keyz, Trapstar Toxic, Streetz and others.

2015–2017: One Foot In and One Foot Out
The song "Can't Blame Me" from his fourth mixtape One Foot In (2015) gained 19 million views. The mixtape One Foot In served as a prequel to his debut album.

The first promotional music video for One Foot Out was "Trapper of the Year", released on 27 August 2016, amassing more than 10 million views.

In December 2016, Nines signed to British independent label XL Recordings, partnering with them to release his debut studio album One Foot Out (2017). The release date was announced the day before its release, becoming available for purchase on 10 February 2017. It entered the UK Albums Chart at number 4, becoming one of the few English rappers to receive a top 5 album in recent years, among Skepta, Giggs and Krept and Konan.

2018: Crop Circle
In early April 2018, Nines released his first single since the release of his debut album, "I See You Shining", alongside a music video. It peaked at number 37 on the UK Singles Chart, becoming Nines' first and highest-charting single. It was later revealed to serve as the lead single to Nines' second album, Crop Circle, which was announced three days before release. It was released on 20 April 2018 by XL Recordings.

2020–present: Crabs in a Bucket
Crabs in a Bucket was released on 28 August 2020 by Zino Records and Warner Records. It is the follow-up to Nines' second album, Crop Circle (2018). The album features guest appearances from Headie One, Roy Woods, Nafe Smallz, NorthSideBenji, NSG, Tiggs da Author, among others. It reached number one on the UK Albums Chart.

Drug convictions
On 12 August 2021, Nines admitted a charge relating to a plot with others to import 28 kilograms of cannabis from Spain and Poland, and admitted a further charge of money laundering related to a £98,000 debt and the street value of the cannabis. He was remanded in custody awaiting sentencing. On 1 October, he was sentenced to 28 months in HM Prison Wormwood Scrubs. He had served 18 months previously for possession of the same drug with intent to supply.

Discography

Studio albums

Mixtapes

Singles

As lead artist

As featured artist

Other charted and certified songs

References

Black British male rappers
English male rappers
Rappers from London
English songwriters
People from Harlesden
Living people
1990 births
English people of Jamaican descent
Gangsta rappers
British male songwriters